Stepaside or Step Aside may refer to:
Placenames
Stepaside, Cornwall, a hamlet in the United Kingdom
Stepaside, Dublin, a suburb in Ireland
Stepaside, Pembrokeshire, a hamlet in Wales
Stepaside, Powys, a hamlet in Wales
Stepaside Spur, Ross Dependency, Antarctica, a mountainous ridge 

Other
"Step Aside", a song by Sleater-Kinney from their 2002 album One Beat
"Step Aside", a song by Efterklang from their 2004 album Tripper
The step-aside rule, an internal policy of the African National Congress

See also
Step Aside for a Lady, 1980 album by Cissy Houston